Hypholoma fasciculare, commonly known as the sulphur tuft or clustered woodlover,  is a common woodland mushroom, often in evidence when hardly any other mushrooms are to be found. This saprotrophic small gill fungus grows prolifically in large clumps on stumps, dead roots or rotting trunks of broadleaved trees.

The "sulphur tuft" is bitter and poisonous; consuming it can cause vomiting, diarrhea and convulsions. The principal toxin is a steroid known as fasciculol E.

Taxonomy and naming
The specific epithet is derived from the Latin fascicularis  'in bundles' or 'clustered',  referring to its habit of growing in clumps. Its name in Japanese is Nigakuritake (苦栗茸, means "Bitter kuritake").

Description
It is smooth and sulphur yellow with an orange-brown centre and whitish margin. The crowded gills are initially yellow but darken to a distinctive green colour as the blackish spores develop on the yellow flesh. It has a purple-brown spore print. The taste is very bitter, though not bitter when cooked, but still poisonous.

Similar species 
The edible Hypholoma capnoides is similar, but lacks the greenish-yellow gills and bitter taste. H. sublateritium is similar as well, with a reddish cap.

Distribution and habitat
Hypholoma fasciculare grows prolifically on the dead wood of both deciduous and coniferous trees. It is more commonly found on decaying deciduous wood due to the lower lignin content of this wood relative to coniferous wood.  Hypholoma fasciculare is widespread and abundant in northern Europe and North America. It has been recorded from Iran, and also eastern Anatolia in Turkey. It can appear anytime from spring to autumn.

Use in forestry
Hypholoma fasciculare has been used successfully as an experimental treatment to competitively displace a common fungal disease of conifers, Armillaria solidipes, from managed coniferous forests.

Chemistry and toxicity
The toxicity of sulfur tuft mushrooms has been attributed, at least partially, to steroid depsipeptides fasciculol E and fasciculol F (in mice, with LD50(i.p.) values of 50 mg/kg and 168 mg/kg, respectively). In humans, symptoms may be delayed for 5–10 hours after consumption, after which time there may be diarrhea, nausea, vomiting, proteinuria and collapse. Paralysis and impaired vision have been recorded. Symptoms generally resolve over a few days. The autopsy of one fatality revealed fulminant hepatitis reminiscent of amatoxin poisoning, along with involvement of kidneys and myocardium. The mushroom was consumed in a dish with other species so the death cannot be attributed to sulfur tuft with certainty.

Extracts of the mushroom show anticoagulant effects.

Gallery

References

External links
 

fasciculare
Poisonous fungi
Fungi described in 1778
Fungi of North America
Fungi of Europe